Allan Guthrie (born Allan Buchan; 5 June 1965) is a Scottish literary agent, author and editor of crime fiction. He was born in Orkney, but has lived in Edinburgh for most of his adult life. His first novel, Two-Way Split, was shortlisted for the CWA Debut Dagger Award, and it won the Theakston's Old Peculier Crime Novel of the Year Award in 2007. His second novel, Kiss Her Goodbye, was nominated for an Edgar Award, an Anthony Award, and a Gumshoe Award.

Guthrie is part of a literary circle that includes Ken Bruen, Reed Farrel Coleman, and Jason Starr.

Guthrie's books are published by Polygon, an imprint of Birlinn Limited.

Novels 
Two-Way Split (2004)
Kiss Her Goodbye (2005)
Hard Man (2007)
Savage Night (2008)
Slammer (2009)

Novellas 
Kill Clock (2007)
Killing Mum (2009)
Bye Bye Baby (2010)

Available in ebook format 
Killing Mum
Bye Bye Baby

and released in ebook format in Summer 2011
Two-Way Split

Available in ebook format 1 September 2011
Slammer

Prizes and awards
2001   CWA Debut Dagger (nominee): Blithe Psychopaths (Two-Way Split)
2006   Mystery Writers of America Best Paperback Original Award (nominee): Kiss Her Goodbye
2006   Anthony Award (nominee): Kiss Her Goodbye
2006   The Mystery Ink Gumshoe Award (nominee): Kiss Her Goodbye
2007   Theakston's Old Peculier Crime Novel of the Year Award (winner): Two-Way Split

Digital publishing 

On 1 November 2011, Allan Guthrie together with serial entrepreneur Kyle MacRae, launched Blasted Heath, the first digital-only Scottish publisher. All Blasted Heath ebooks were free from digital rights management (DRM) and were supplied in three file formats to ensure compatibility with all then current ebook readers.

PRC works on the Kindle, EPUB with virtually all other readers, including Nook and Sony and PDF for computers and smartphones.

The opening line-up of Blasted Heath titles included three crime novels by Ray Banks, Douglas Lindsay and Anthony Neil Smith. Also two debut novels, a cyber-thriller by Gary Carson and a novel for film lovers by movie critic Brian Pendreigh, were also available to buy.

Blasted Heath closed doors on March 20, 2017.

References

External links
Official website
How to Publish an Ebook (in 9 Easy-to-Follow Steps) Official site
Scots Author turns back on print to push ebooks". The Daily Record, 1 November 2011. Retrieved 12 November 2011.

1965 births
Living people
Scottish crime fiction writers
People from Orkney
Tartan Noir writers